The Ministry of Fishing and Aquaculture (abbreviated MPA) is a cabinet-level federal ministry in Brazil. The ministry reported directly to the President of Brazil in formulating policies and guidelines for the development and promotion of fishing and aquaculture. It was established on January 1, 2003, as the Special Secretariat of Aquaculture and Fisheries (Secretaria Especial da Aquicultura e Pesca, SEAP). Its elevation to ministry level occurred on June 26, 2009, under Law No. 11,958.

See also
 Other ministries of Fishing
 Ministry of Agrarian Development
 Ministry of Agriculture (Brazil)

References

External links
 Official site

Fishing and Aquaculture
Brazil
Brazil
Agricultural organisations based in Brazil